Mark Kriegel is an American author, journalist, and television commentator.

Early years
He is the son of author and essayist, Leonard Kriegel. He grew up in New York City, and attended Stuyvesant High School, Swarthmore College, and the Columbia University Graduate School of Journalism.

Author
Kriegel is the author of critically acclaimed New York Times bestsellers, Namath: A Biography, about Hall of Fame quarterback Joe Namath, and Pistol: the Life of Pete Maravich. His 2012 book, The Good Son: The Life of Ray “Boom Boom” Mancini – about a boxer's relationship with his father, and a man who died at his hands in the ring – was made into a documentary by the same name.

Kriegel's work often focuses on conflicts between fathers and sons in sports – especially boxing. A front-page column he wrote for the New York Post, detailing the relationship between boxing trainer Teddy Atlas, Mafia figure Sammy (“the Bull”) Gravano, and Gravano's son, became the basis for his novel, Bless Me, Father, which drew praise from the writer Richard Price, and the Los Angeles Times (which called it “mesmerizing.”)

Journalism
He worked as a general assignment reporter at The Miami Herald and The New York Daily News. In 1990, his piece for the Daily News Sunday Magazine, “The People’s Court” – an examination of basketball culture in New York – was a finalist for the Pulitzer Prize in the Feature Writing category.

The following year, he became a sports columnist at the New York Post. From 1994 to 2001, he was a columnist at the Daily News. He has also been a national columnist at FOXSports.com, and a contributing writer for Esquire. His Esquire profile of boxer Oscar De Hoya – “The Great (Almost) White Hope” was anthologized in At the Fights: American Writers on Boxing and The Book of Boxing, edited by W.C. Heinz.

Television
In 2011–12, Kriegel hosted a sports-themed interview show, Barfly, for FOX Sports Net. In June, 2012, he joined the NFL Network as an analyst on the launch of its morning show, NFL AM. He now does essay pieces for the network's Total Access show and Sunday features for Game Day Morning. Kriegel also writes the Emmy-winning All Access series for Showtime. His All Access: Chávez, about the turbulent relationship between the great Mexican boxer, Julio César Chávez, and his son, Julio Jr., explores the same father-son themes Kriegel focused on as a biographer.

He has been part of Emmy-winning teams for the NFL Network (2013 for “Outstanding New Approaches”) and Showtime (2015 for “Outstanding Sports Documentary Series”)

In January, 2016, Showtime launched a digital series, “The Reveal with Mark Kriegel,” featuring deep dive, often emotional interviews with boxers and other sports personalities."

In 2017, he wrote and co-produced a feature-length documentary about Prison Fight “Prison Fighters: 5 Rounds to Freedom,” the story of a controversial government program that allows inmates to fight for their freedom in Muay Thai matches. The program, as Kriegel told the New York Post: “Can violent men redeem themselves through violent acts?”

In 2022, Kriegel narrated a tribute package for Shad Gaspard's posthumous induction into the WWE Hall of Fame as the class of 2022's Warrior Award recipient

“He's been a part of three Emmy-winning teams for the NFL Network and Showtime.

Personal
Kriegel lives in Santa Monica, California, with his daughter, Holiday.

References

External links
NFL.com Profile

Living people
American sports journalists
Year of birth missing (living people)